Andrei Vladimirovich Mulikov (born October 19, 1968) is a Russian professional football coach and a former player.

Club career
He made his professional debut in the Soviet Second League in 1989 for FC Terek Grozny.

Honours
 Russian Premier League bronze: 1994.

References

1968 births
Living people
Soviet footballers
Russian footballers
Association football defenders
FC Dynamo Moscow reserves players
Russian Premier League players
Russian football managers
FC Akhmat Grozny players
FC Asmaral Moscow players
FC Lokomotiv Moscow players
FC Chernomorets Novorossiysk players
FC Elista players
FC Dynamo Stavropol players
FC Dynamo Stavropol managers